Ehvin Sasidharan (born 14 February 1996 in Singapore) is a Singaporean retired footballer.

Career

While playing for the Singaporean National Football Academy under-17 team, Sasidharan was nicknamed "Father".

References

External links
 Ehvin Sasidharan at Soccerway

Singaporean footballers
Singaporean people of Tamil descent
Singaporean sportspeople of Indian descent
Living people
Association football defenders
1996 births
Tampines Rovers FC players